Lucía Sombra is a Mexican telenovela produced by Televisa and transmitted by Telesistema Mexicano.

Ofelia Medina, Carlos Cámara, Rosenda Monteros and Raúl Ramírez starred as protagonists.

Cast 
  
Ofelia Medina as Lucía Sombra Calvert
Raúl Ramírez as Pastor Emilio Calvert
Rosenda Monteros as Matilde Guerrero
Beatriz Sheridan as Sara Calvert
Alicia Palacios as Doña Florencia Guerrero
Carlos Cámara as Dr. Pablo Orazábal Guerrero
Susana Alexander as Erika
Miguel Suárez Arias as Don Esteban Guerrero
Enrique Novi as Román Calvert
Andrea Palma as Doña Natividad
Sergio Klainer as Aarón Siavinsky
Ricardo Cortés as Rodrigo Rimac
Víctor Alcocer as Padre Cristóbal
Luis Miranda as Ignacio Suárez
Wally Barrón as Alejo Suárez
Pilar Sen as Helena Suárez
Raúl "Chato" Padilla as Comisario Vidal
Héctor Cruz as Dr. Ricardo Ledesma
Octavio Galindo as Octavio Ravel
Eric del Castillo as Santiago Rangel
Silvia Mariscal as Teresa
Luis Aragón as Sr. Ravel
Aurora Clavel as Sra. Ravel
Jorge del Campo as Minister Pierre Duwa
Malena Doria as Deborah Duwa
Enrique del Castillo as Dr. Islas
Mauricio Ferrari as Sr. Rimac
Alberto Inzúa as Owner of the mine
Margie Bermejo as Srta. Rangel
Fernando Borges as Sr. Rangel
Ada Carrasco as Peasant
Gerardo del Castillo as Peasant
Norma Jiménez Pons as Rodrigo's wife
Edith González as Erika (child)
Fernando Castro
Marcela Davilland 
Ricardo Austi

References 

Mexican telenovelas
1971 telenovelas
Televisa telenovelas
Spanish-language telenovelas
1971 Mexican television series debuts
1972 Mexican television series endings